Christian Pena (born September 19, 1968) is an American professional golfer.

Pena played on the Nike Tour (now Nationwide Tour) in 1993 and 1994. His best finishes were a pair of T-6s, at the 1993 NIKE Monterrey Open and the 1994 NIKE Sonoma County Open. He played briefly on the European Tour in 2000. He played on the Japan Golf Tour from 2000 to 2007, winning once.

Professional wins (3)

Japan Golf Tour wins (1)

Japan Golf Tour playoff record (1–0)

Asian Tour wins (1)

Asia Golf Circuit wins (1)
1996 Matoa Nasional Invitational

External links

American male golfers
Arizona Wildcats men's golfers
PGA Tour golfers
European Tour golfers
Asian Tour golfers
Japan Golf Tour golfers
Golfers from Albuquerque, New Mexico
1968 births
Living people